Bereča Vas is a settlement in the Municipality of Metlika in the White Carniola area of southeastern Slovenia. The entire area is part of the traditional region of Lower Carniola and is now included in the Southeast Slovenia Statistical Region.

The local church is dedicated to Saint James and belongs to the Parish of Suhor. It was built in the 17th century.

References

External links
 
Bereča Vas on Geopedia

Populated places in the Municipality of Metlika